Bilyesta dactylozoides is a species of beetles in the family Buprestidae, the only species in the genus Bilyesta.

References

Monotypic Buprestidae genera